The Iceland national under-19 football team, controlled by the Football Association of Iceland, represents Iceland at the European Under-19 Football Championship and international friendly match fixtures at the under-19 age level.

European Championships

Introduction 
Since it adopted its current format in 2002, the Iceland under-19s have failed to qualify for the UEFA European Under-19 Football Championship. As of 2011, their best qualifying campaign performances came in 2007 and 2008, when they qualified for the second, or 'elite', qualification stage.

In the qualifying campaign for the 2007 tournament, the team finished joint second place in the elite qualification stage behind the Spain under-19s, who went on to win the tournament. In 2008, the Iceland under-19s recorded elite stage victories against the Norway under-19s and the Israel under-19s, but again finished in second place. On that occasion the group winners were the Bulgaria under-19s.

In the 2011 qualification campaign, Iceland finished third in group 1 of the first qualifying stage. Their only points came in a 4–0 victory over the Kazakhstan under-19s, who finished bottom in fourth place.

In the first qualification stage of the 2012 UEFA European Under-19 Football Championship, the Iceland under-19s faced Norway, Latvia and Cyprus, finishing last in the group.  Iceland didn't fare much better in 2013, as they came third in the group and didn't qualify. In 2014 they finished second in Group 4 behind Belgium and ahead of both France and Northern Ireland to qualify for the elite round where they lost all three matches.

History

Players

Current squad
 The following players were called up for the 2023 UEFA European Under-19 Championship qualification matches.
 Match dates: 16, 19 and 22 November 2022
 Caps and goals correct as of: 24 September 2022, after the match against

Recent call-ups
The following players have been called up within the last twelve months and remain available for future selection.

See also
 Iceland national football team
 Iceland national under-21 football team
 Iceland national under-17 football team
 Iceland women's national football team

References

European national under-19 association football teams
Under-19